Antić, Antic, Antiç or Antič is a Serbo-Croatian surname. It is among the 500 most common surnames in Serbia, Bosnia and Herzegovina, Croatia and Kosovo. It is derived from Antonius. It may refer to:

Aleksandar Antić (born 1969), Serbian politician
Alex Antic, Australian politician
Boško Antić (born 1944), Bosnian Serb footballer
Čedomir Antić (born 1974), Serbian historian, political activist
Dejan Antić (born 1968), Serbian grandmaster
Goran Antić (born 1985), Swiss footballer
Igor Antić (born 1962), French-Serbian visual artist
Ivan Antić (1923–2005), Serbian architect
Jelena Antić (born 1991), Macedonian basketball player
Joseph Antic (1931-2016), Indian field hockey player 
Linda Antić (born 1969), Croatian basketball player and coach
Marko Antić (born 1991), Serbian karateka
Mika Antić (1932–1986), Yugoslav poet, film director
Miloš Antić (born 1989), Serbian footballer
Miloš Antić (born 1994), Serbian-Swiss footballer and entrepreneur
Nikola Antić (born 1994), Serbian footballer
Novica Antić (born 1978), Serbian trade unionist 
Pero Antić (born 1982), Macedonian basketballer
Radomir Antić (1948-2020), Serbian football manager
Saša Antić (born 1973), Croatian musician
Sava Antić (1930–1998), Serbian footballer and manager
Sebastijan Antić (born 1991), Croatian football player
Slobodan Antić (born 1950), former Yugoslav footballer
Srđan Antić (born 1960), Serbian basketball coach
Svetlana Mugoša-Antić (born 1964), Serbian handball player
Zoran Antić (born 1975), Serbian footballer

See also

Notes

Serbian surnames
Croatian surnames
Patronymic surnames